Kanchu Kota is a 1967 Indian Telugu-language swashbuckler film, produced by U. Visweswara Rao under the Viswashanti Productions banner and directed by C. S. Rao. It stars N. T. Rama Rao, Kanta Rao, Savitri and Devika, with music composed by K. V. Mahadevan.

Plot
Once upon a time, there was a kingdom Bhallalla ruled by Rajendra Bhupathi a good Samaritan. He bestows the authority to his vagabond brother Vijayendra Bhupathi to reform him. But unfortunately, he becomes impolitic due to insnare of his venomous brother-in-law, chief minister Bhairavacharya. Bhairava’s meaning of life is to make his daughter Madhavi an empress, so, he assassins Rajendra via henchmen Martanda on behalf of Vijayendra. In that, chaos queen Rajeshwari Devi escapes with prince Surendra. Being cognizant of it, Vijayendra onslaughts on Bhairava where he is backstabbed and lost one limb. However, he is rescued by a devoted soldier Sowrya Varma by sacrificing his life. Before dying, he entrusts the responsibility of his daughter Jayanthi to Vijayendra. Parallelly, in the fort, Bhairava supersedes Martanda as Vijayendra, promising to offer the kingdom and his daughter’s hand to his infant son. At this point, Bhairava throws a spiteful pawn who slaughters Martanda’s kid, shuffles him with his nephew Narendra and also seizes his sister Vijayeswari Devi.

Years roll by, and the evil forces prevail all over the kingdom under the guidance of Bhairava and implemented by a dreadful dacoit Prachanda. Thereby, Surendra the hidden prince to hit the roof and takes action to question the government. On the way, he falls for Jayanthi and also safeguards prince Narendra from Prachanda. At present, an intimacy develops between Surendra & Narendra, with his help, Surendra meets dead ringer Vijayendra and confronts his petition. Gazing at his caliber Bhairava designates Surendra as a Chief commander. Currently, Surendra comes in contact with Madhavi and she has a beloved crush on him. Narendra adores Madhavi and he implicit that she too feels the same. Here, destiny makes Madhavi & Jayanti bosom buddies, who move every day to meet each other. One night, Surendra feels something fishy in the fort when he spots Madhavi reaching a secret temple that is surreptitious from her room. So, he behinds her and realizes that the main secret behind the unrest in the kingdom lies in the fort itself, so, he starts digging it. Another night, through Madhavi's bedroom, he reaches the inside of a cave, suddenly, falls into the basement where he notices a lot of hidden wealth, and comes to blow with Prachanda’s right-hand men. Thereafter, he lands in the courtyard and breakouts the mystery. For a while, Surendra proceeds to meet Jayanti where he detects an unknown person and backs him through a cave where he boggles to see Vijayendra. Narendra backs Surendra and pounces on true Vijayendra in a veil and but he darts.

Meanwhile, Jayanti learns about Madhavi’s love, so, she takes a vow from Surendra to nuptial Madhavi. Forthwith, the real Vijayendra plans to kill Narendra misinterpreting him as Martanda’s son. So, he gives a call in the name of Surendra where he backstabs him. In time, Surendra arrives, protects Narendra, and is about to kill Vijayendra, he divulges the entire story to Surendra and they unite. Later, Surendra returns to the fort where forged Vijayendra apprehends him and counterfeits him as a betrayer before Narendra. Moreover, he infuriates by sensing Madhavi's craving for him, Narendra badly hits Surendra when he opens his love affair with Jayanti which Madhavi overhears. Hence, she frees Surendra, proceeds to Jayanti, and pays him back. On the other hand, true Vijayendra enters the surreptitious temple to let Surendra out where he finds his imprisoned wife Vijayeswari Devi and is aware of the facts. However, enraged Narendra chases Madhavi when grievous combat erupts between the friends during which Madhavi dies. At last, everyone reaches the bronze fort and reveals the diabolic pawns of Bhairava. Looking at Madhavi’s dead body Bhairava turns insane and leaves his breath. Finally, the movie ends with the marriage and crowing ceremony of Surendra.

Cast

N. T. Rama Rao as Surendra
Kanta Rao as Narendra
Savitri as Madhavi
Devika as Jayanthi
V. Nagayya as Rajendra Bhupathi
Rajanala as Prachanda
Dhulipala as Mahamantri Bhairavacharya
Satyanarayana as Sowrya Varma
Udaya Kumar as Vijayendra Bhupathi
Ramana Reddy as Pullaiah
Padmanabham as Bhaja Govindam
Prabhakar Reddy as Marthanda
Chadalavada as Kotilingam
Balakrishna as Yallaiah
Kanchana as Dancer
Vanisri as Bangari
L. Vijayalakshmi as Dancer
Santha Kumari as Rajeswari Devi
T. G. Kamala Devi as Vijayeswari Devi
Jayasri as Dancer

Soundtrack

Music composed by K. V. Mahadevan. Music released by Audio Company.

References

External links 

 

Indian fantasy adventure films
Films directed by C. S. Rao
Films scored by K. V. Mahadevan
Indian swashbuckler films
1960s Telugu-language films